Dennis Michael Cavanaugh (born January 28, 1947) is a retired United States district judge of the United States District Court for the District of New Jersey.

Early life and education

Cavanaugh was born on January 28, 1947, in Orange, New Jersey. He was raised as an Irish Catholic. Cavanaugh was educated at Morehead State University (Bachelor of Arts, 1969) and Seton Hall University School of Law (Juris Doctor, 1972). Cavanaugh teaches at Seton Hall as a member of the law school's adjunct faculty.

Career

Cavanaugh began his legal career as a law clerk to Judge Francis W. Hayden in the New Jersey Superior Court (1972–73).  He was then an Assistant Deputy Public Defender for the New Jersey Office of the Public Defender (1973–77) before entering private practice in various law firms in New Jersey (1977–92). Cavanaugh's private practice includes his partnership at the law firms of McCormack Petrolle & Matthews (1992), Whipple Ross & Hirsh (1987–92) and Tompkins McGuire & Wachenfeld (1984–87).  He also served as a partner (1980–84) and associate (1977–80) at Lum Biunno & Tompkins. Cavanaugh was the Borough Prosecutor for the Borough of Caldwell (1988–89).

Federal judicial service

Cavanaugh was nominated by President Bill Clinton on May 3, 2000, to a seat on the United States District Court for the District of New Jersey vacated by Judge Alfred M. Wolin. Cavanaugh was confirmed by the United States Senate on July 21, 2000, and received commission on September 20, 2000. Cavanaugh was formerly a United States magistrate judge of the same district (1993–2000). His service terminated on January 31, 2014, due to retirement.

References

Sources

1947 births
Living people
Morehead State University alumni
People from Orange, New Jersey
Public defenders
Judges of the United States District Court for the District of New Jersey
Seton Hall University School of Law alumni
United States district court judges appointed by Bill Clinton
United States magistrate judges
20th-century American judges
21st-century American judges